Kent 2 (known as Shepherd Neame Kent 2 for sponsorship reasons) is an English level 10 Rugby Union League and is made up of teams predominantly from south-east London and Kent. The teams play home and away matches from September through to April. Currently promoted teams move up to Kent 1 and there is no relegation although until the 2007–08 season teams could drop down to Kent 3 (now folded). Now a single division, in the past Kent 2 was divided into regional divisions - Kent 2 East and Kent 2 West.

Each year some of the clubs in this division also take part in the RFU Junior Vase - a level 9-12 national competition.

Teams for 2021-22

The teams competing in 2021-22 achieved their places in the league based on performances in 2019-20, the 'previous season' column in the table below refers to that season not 2020-21. 

Bexley, who finished 8th in 2019-20, played several of the early fixtures but withdrew from the league in November 2021.

Swanley RFC, a new entry, competed until January 2022 before withdrawing from the league.

Season 2020–21

On 30th October 2020 the RFU announced  that due to the coronavirus pandemic a decision had been taken to cancel Adult Competitive Leagues (National League 1 and below) for the 2020/21 season meaning Kent 2 was not contested.

Teams for 2019-20

Teams for 2018-19

Teams for 2017-18

Teams for 2016-17
Askean
Bexley 
Dartford Valley
Edenbridge
Erith
Faversham
Footscray
Greenwich
Lordswood (relegated from Kent 1)
Old Gravsesendians (relegated from Kent 1)
Orpington
Royal Bank of Scotland
Shooters Hill
Whitstable

Teams for 2015-2016
Askean
Bexley (relegated from Kent 1)
Dartford Valley
Edenbridge
Faversham
Footscray
Greenwich
Orpington
Shooters Hill
Sittingbourne (relegated from Kent 1)
Snowdown C.W.
Whitstable

Teams for 2014-2015
Askean
Brockleians
Dartford Valley
Edenbridge
Faversham
Footscray (relegated from Kent 1)
Greenwich
New Ash Green
Orpington
Shooters Hill (relegated from Kent 1)

Teams for 2013-2014
Ash
Askean
Bexley
Brockleians
Dartford Valley (www.dvrfc.com)
Edenbridge
Faversham
Guys Hospital
Lordswood
New Ash Green
Orpington
Whitstable

Teams for 2009-2010
Askean
Bexley
Brockleians
Footscray
Kings Coll. Hospital
Lordswood
New Ash Green
Old Williamsonians
Orpington
Shooters Hill

Original teams

When league rugby began in 1987 this division contained the following teams:

Ashford
Betteshanger
Dover
Folkestone
Greenwich
Lloyds Bank
Met Police Hayes
Midland Bank
Orpington
Snowdown C.W.
Thames Polytechnic

Kent 2 honours

Kent 2 (1987–1993)

he original Kent 2 was a tier 9 league with promotion up to Kent 1 and relegation down to Kent 3.

Kent 2 (1993–1996)

The creation of National 5 South meant that Kent 2 dropped from a tier 9 league to a tier 10 league for the years that National 5 South was active.  Promotion and relegation continued to Kent 1 and Kent 3 respectively.

Kent 2 (1996–1998)

The cancellation of National 5 South at the end of the 1995–96 season meant that Kent 2 reverted to being a tier 9 league.  Promotion continued to Kent 1 and Kent 3 respectively.

Kent 2 East / West (1998–2000) 

The cancellation of Kent 3 ahead of the 1997–98 season saw Kent 2 restructured into two regional division - Kent 2 East and Kent 2 West - both of which were tier 9 leagues.  Promotion continued to Kent 1 and there was no relegation until Kent 3 was reintroduced.

Kent 2 (2000–2009) 

Kent 2 was restructured back into a single division for the 2000–01 season, although the introduction of London 4 South East meant that it fell to become a tier 10 league.  Promotion continued to Kent 1, while the reintroduction of Kent 3 meant that there was relegation until this league was cancelled at the end of the 2007–08 season.

Kent 2 (2009–present)

Kent 2 remained a tier 10 league despite national restructuring by the RFU.  Promotion continued to Kent 1 and there was no relegation.

Number of league titles

Ashford (2)
Aylesford Bulls (2)
Betteshanger (2)
Brockleians (2)
Erith (2)
New Ash Green (2)
Old Gravesendians (2)
Sittingbourne (2)
Bexley (1)
Canterbury (1)
Cliffe Crusaders (1)
Folkestone (1)
Greenwich (1)
Guys' Kings' & St Thomas' Hospital (1)
HSBC (1)
King's College Hospital (1)
Lordswood (1)
Medway (1)
Midland Bank (1)
New Ash Green (1)
Old Elthamians (1)
Old Shootershillians (1)
Old Williamsonians (1)
Park House (1)
Sevenoaks (1)
Thames Polytechnic (1)
Tonbridge (1)
Whitstable (1)

Notes

See also
London & SE Division RFU
Kent RFU
English rugby union system
Rugby union in England

References

External links
Kent Rugby Football Union

Rugby union leagues in England
Rugby union in Kent